The Old City Hammam in Mitrovica is representative of the Ottoman architecture in Kosovo.

History 
The Old City Hammam was constructed in oriental style by Sulejman Pashe Berisha and his nephew Zejnullah Beg Berisha in the 18th century. A right-angled annex, 15 m long and 10 m wide was added at the end of the 19th century. It is the only hammam in Kosovo built with familiar budget and not by the government. The roof of the building has nine domes, one big central dome and eight small domes, covered in lead and zinc. At that time, it was an essential part of the city and was used as a Turkish bath. The built process took two years. The first floor is paved with marble and in the center there is a water fountain. The second floor was used to get undressed before going into the hammam. The main part of the hammam has four rooms. A 40-ton boiler was used to supply the rooms with water. The hammam and the annex cover more than 1200 square meters. This space was used by men and women at different times. Men used the bath in the morning from 7 to 10 am and from 11 am to 5 pm it was used by women. Fridays and Sundays were reserved for men. The hammam was also used for weddings and other celebrations. The hammam was functional until May 1959. The monument represents special oriental architecture value and has been protected since 1957. From 1960 to 2009 the building was used as a regional museum with four sectors: archaeology, ethnology, geology and history. In 2009, the museum moved to an ex-army building. From November 2009, the building was returned to the heir of the ex owner and now a part of it operates as a restaurant.

See also 
 Mitrovica, Kosovo

References

Monuments and memorials in Kosovo
District of Mitrovica
Ottoman architecture in Kosovo
Cultural heritage of Kosovo
Cultural heritage monuments in Mitrovica, Kosovo